Biobessa holzschuhi is a species of beetle in the family Cerambycidae. It was described by Téocchi in 1991.

References

Crossotini
Beetles described in 1991